"We Both Walk" is a song written by Tom Shapiro and Chris Waters, and recorded by American country music artist Lorrie Morgan.  It was released in March 1991 as the first single from her album Something in Red.  The song reached #3 on the Billboard Hot Country Singles & Tracks chart in June 1991.

Chart performance

Year-end charts

References

1991 singles
Lorrie Morgan songs
Songs written by Tom Shapiro
Songs written by Chris Waters
RCA Records singles
Song recordings produced by Richard Landis
1991 songs